The 2011–12 Antigua and Barbuda Premier Division (also known as the 2011–12 ABFA OBSERVER Group Premier Division for sponsoring purposes) is the 44th season of the highest competitive football league of Antigua and Barbuda. It began on 15 October 2011 and will conclude in March 2012. Parham FC are the defending champions having won their 3rd championship last season. All games are played at the Antigua Recreation Ground.

Teams
Villa Lions FC and A&R Smitty FC were relegated to the Antigua and Barbuda First Division after finishing in ninth and tenth place at the end of last season. They were replaced by the top two clubs from the First Division, Willikies FC and Pigotts Bullets.

SAP FC finished in 8th place last season and had to participate in a three-team playoff with the 3rd and 4th place teams of the First Division, Potters FC and Swetes FC, for one spot in this competition. SAP finished first after this playoff, thus retaining their spot in the league.

League table

Results

Promotion/relegation playoffs 
At the end of the year, the eighth-place finisher in the league will be in a three team round robin tournament with the 3rd and 4th place teams from the First Division. At the end of the playoff, the top team will be placed in next year's Premier Division while the other two will take part in the First Division.

Results:

Bassa retain his Premier Division level, while Villa Lions and Ottos Rangers still on the First Division.

References 

1
Antigua
Antigua and Barbuda Premier Division seasons